Microphor is a genus of flies in the family Dolichopodidae, subfamily Microphorinae.

Species
At least 16 extant species are described in the genus, with nine from the Palaearctic realm, one from the Oriental realm, and five from the Nearctic realm. Three fossil species have also been described. There are also several undescribed species from the sub-Mediterranean region of Europe and Turkey, and one undescribed species from the Neotropical realm. One species from the Australasian realm, Microphor hiemalis, has also been described, but it does not appear to be cogeneric and may not belong in the subfamily Microphorinae.

 Microphor anomalus (Meigen, 1824)
 Microphor bilineatus (Melander, 1902)
 Microphor crassipes Macquart, 1827
 †Microphor defunctus Handlirsch, 1910
 Microphor discalis Melander, 1940
 †Microphor eocenica (Meunier, 1902)
 Microphor gissaricus Shamshev, 1992
 Microphor hiemalis White, 1916
 Microphor holosericeus (Meigen, 1804)
 Microphor intermedius Collin, 1961
 Microphor obscurus Coquillett, 1903
 Microphor pilimanus Strobl, 1899
 Microphor rostellatus Loew, 1864
 †Microphor rusticus Meunier, 1908
 Microphor sinensis Saigusa & Yang, 2003
 Microphor skevingtoni Brooks & Cumming, 2022
 Microphor strobli Chvála, 1986
 Microphor turneri Brooks & Cumming, 2022
 Microphor zimini Shamshev, 1995

Species transferred to Schistostoma:
 Microphor armipes Melander, 1928
 Microphor atratus Coquillett, 1900
 Microphor cirripes Melander, 1940
 Microphor evisceratus Melander, 1940
 Microphor isommatus Melander, 1928
 Microphor ravidus Coquillett, 1895
 Microphor ravus Melander, 1940: synonym of Schistostoma evisceratum (Melander, 1940)
 Microphor robustus Melander, 1928
 Microphor strigilifer Melander, 1940
 Microphor sycophantor (Melander, 1902)
 Microphor tacomae Melander, 1940

Species transferred to other genera:
 Microphorus crocatus Coquillett, 1900: now in Euthyneura
 Microphorus drapetoides Walker, 1849: now in Bicellaria
 Microphorus flavipilosus Coquillett, 1900: now in Iteaphila
 Microphorus gilvihirta Coquillett, 1903: now in Anthalia
 Microphorus zontaki Nowicki, 1870: now in Iteaphila

References

Dolichopodidae genera
Microphorinae
Taxa named by Pierre-Justin-Marie Macquart